are a Japanese football (soccer) club based in Urayasu, Chiba. They will play from the 2023 season at the Japan Football League, coming back to the league after being relegated from it in 2017. It will be their second time playing at Japan's 4th division.

History 
Founded in 1989 as Urayasu Junior Football Club, the team was established in Chiba Prefecture. The name refers to a mix composed by Brionac, a spear appeared in Celtic mythology, and Becca, a one-seater ship used to collect nori, a Japanese cuisine delicacy, typical of that region. The mascot – Maiko Becca – was presented in 2017, one year after drawing its design. A JFL membership was granted in 2016, the season where Briobecca gained promotion to the 4th tier. After two seasons on the league, the club got demoted back to the Kantō Soccer League.
On 2022, the club participated in the 2022 Shakaijin Cup, winning the tournament. Their performance at the competition qualified the club to the 2022 Japanese Regional Football Champions League. Remaining unbeaten throughout the tournament, Briobecca Urayasu was able to win the title. Then, the club officially returned to the Japan Football League after a five-season absence from it. The club secured promotion, and the title, only at the final round, after a vital win over Tochigi City FC by 3–1, which also secured their first title in the competition. On the same year, the club recorded their worst performance at the Kanto League since their JFL relegation on 2017.

Stadium 
After playing at Briobecca Urayasu Stadium in 2022, Briobecca Urayasu return to home stadium at Kashiwanoha Stadium for 2023 season after two years at JFL in 2016–2017 end relegation on 10 February 2023 due to fully schedule.

League record 

Key

Emperor's Cup record

Honours 
Kantō Soccer League (Div. 2): 2013
Kantō Soccer League (Div. 1): 2014, 2015
Shakaijin Cup: 2022
Japanese Regional Football Champions League: 2022

Current squad 
As of 19 February 2023.

Club staff 
For the 2023 season.

Kit evolution

Stadiums

References

External links 
 Official Website 
 Facebook Page
 Twitter Account
 Instagram Account

Football clubs in Japan
Association football clubs established in 1989
Sports teams in Chiba Prefecture
1989 establishments in Japan
Japan Football League clubs